Aarons is an unincorporated community in Kanawha County, West Virginia, United States.

History
A post office called Aarons was established in 1888, and remained in operation until 1916. The community was named after nearby Aarons Fork.

References 

Unincorporated communities in West Virginia
Unincorporated communities in Kanawha County, West Virginia